Huidong railway station is a railway station located in Huidong County, Guangdong Huizhou, Guangzhou City, Guangdong Province, China, on the Xiamen–Shenzhen railway operated by the Guangzhou Railway (Group) Corp., China Railway Corporation.

Railway stations in Guangdong